Ahiran Hemangini Vidyaytan School (H.S.) is a co-ed high school located in Ahiran village, Murshidabad District, in the state of West Bengal, India.

Organisation 
Ahiran Hemangini Vidyaytan School (Higher Secondary) was founded in 1965.

The school is affiliated to the West Bengal Board of Secondary Education. The medium of instruction is Bengali.

Higher Secondary
 Science
 Arts

Vocational
 Computer Assembly and Maintenance
 Automobile mechanics

References

High schools and secondary schools in West Bengal
Schools in Murshidabad district
Educational institutions established in 1965
1965 establishments in West Bengal